The Nass Ranges are a mountain range north of the Skeena River, west of Hazelton, and northeast of Terrace, British Columbia, Canada. It is associated with the Hazelton Mountains, which in turn form part of the Interior Mountains.

Volcanic eruption

The Nass Ranges contain an active volcano called Tseax Cone; its volcanic gases caused the death of approximately 2,000 Nisga'a people during the 18th century.

Mountains
Mountains within the Nass Ranges include:

Kiteen Ridge
Maroon Mountain
Mount Garland
Tseax Cone

References

Hazelton Mountains